Richard Saville Clement Lucas (27 July 1896 – 29 May 1968) was a British rower who competed in the 1920 Summer Olympics.

Lucas was born at St Marylebone London and served in the Royal Artillery during World War I, being a 2nd lieutenant in 1915. After the war he went to Oxford University and was a proficient rower. He was a member of the Leander eight which won the silver medal for Great Britain rowing at the 1920 Summer Olympics, coming within half a length of winning.

In 1921, he was a member of the Oxford crew in the Boat Race. He was also five times a member of the winning crew in the Grand Challenge Cup at Henley Royal Regatta.

Lucas and his wife Rene spent their later years rescuing abandoned boats. In 1947, they rescued the yacht Lulworth which they mud-berthed and used it as a houseboat. Lucas died of a heart attack while sailing his dinghy.

See also
List of Oxford University Boat Race crews

References

External links
Profile at databaseOlympics.com

1886 births
1968 deaths
English male rowers
British male rowers
Olympic rowers of Great Britain
Rowers at the 1920 Summer Olympics
Olympic silver medallists for Great Britain
Olympic medalists in rowing
Medalists at the 1920 Summer Olympics
British Army personnel of World War I
Royal Artillery officers